Marshalcy (or occasionally maréchaussée or marechaussee) may refer to:

The office and rank of a marshal
Any gendarmerie or military force component with jurisdiction in civil law enforcement
Maréchaussée, the French Ancien Régime military police force
Royal Marechaussee, the military police force of the Netherlands
Maréchaussée (Grimm), the 12th episode of season 4 of the television series Grimm

See also
Marshalsea, a former prison, London